Bommelkous is a hamlet  in the Dutch province of South Holland and is part of the municipality of Hoeksche Waard.

Bommelkous is not a statistical entity, and considered part of Klaaswaal. It has no place name signs, and consists of about 50 houses.

References

Populated places in South Holland
Hoeksche Waard